Kuhnert is a German surname. Notable people with the surname include:

Alfred Kuhnert (1898–1977), German Wehrmacht general
Hans Kuhnert (1901–1974), German actor, art director and production designer
Silvio Kuhnert (born 1969), German singer
Wilhelm Kuhnert (1865–1926), German painter, writer and illustrator

See also
Kühnert
Kuhnert Arboretum, an arboretum in Aberdeen, South Dakota

Surnames from given names
German-language surnames